H. Dada Rosada (alternatively Kang Dada), is the former mayor of Bandung City, West Java, Indonesia.

In 2014, he was found guilty of corruption and was sentenced to 10 years in prison.

References

1947 births
Living people
People from Bandung
Mayors of Bandung
Sundanese people
Mayors of places in Indonesia